Sulcospira testudinaria is a species of freshwater snail with an operculum, an aquatic gastropod mollusk in the family Pachychilidae.

Distribution 

This species occurs in:
 Java

References

 Marwoto R.M. & Isnaningsih N.R. (2012) "The freshwater snail genus Sulcospira Troschel, 1857 from Java, with description of a new species from Tasikmalaya, West Java, Indonesia (Mollusca: Gastropoda: Pachychilidae)." The Raffles Bulletin of Zoology 60(1): 1–10.

External links 

Pachychilidae
Gastropods described in 1842